Overseas Chinese High School or Overseas Chinese Middle and High School may refer to:
Seoul Overseas Chinese High School
Busan Overseas Chinese High School
Daegu Overseas Chinese High School